Hoćemo gusle (trans. We Want Gusle) is the second studio album released in 1989 by Montenegrin-Serbian musician Rambo Amadeus.

The track "Amerika i Engleska (biće zemlja proleterska)" was originally supposed to be named "Kataklizma komunizma" (Cataclysm of Communism) but powers that be wouldn't allow it. The album title pokes fun at the anti-bureaucratic revolution protests in Montenegro that swept Milo Đukanović, Momir Bulatović, and Svetozar Marović into power. Protesters were heard chanting "Hoćemo Ruse" ("We want the Russians"), but when the authorities and state-controlled media criticized them for it, many quickly began backpedaling by claiming they actually chanted "Hoćemo gusle" ("We want the gusle").

Other songs like "Glupi hit" and afore mentioned "Balkan boj" would also become considerable hits and Rambo even received solid critical acclaim for chances he took in "Samit u buregdžinici Laibach". On that track, he created a catchy hybrid by mixing pretentiously heavy sound of Laibach with poetry of Laza Kostić and Desanka Maksimović, as well as with folk kafana standard "Čaše lomim" and his own turbo-poetry. Album sleeve lists the lyrics of a song that wasn't actually recorded and explains that "it was dropped at the last moment because there was no room for it" but gives assurances it would appear on the next album. Since the song in question, named "Pegepe ertebe", was all about taking shots at Rambo's label PGP RTB it isn't surprising that it didn't appear on the next, or any subsequent album for that matter.

Track listing
All songs by Rambo Amadeus.

Personnel 
Backing Vocals — Sanja Čičanović
Bass — Dejan Škopelja
Drums — Relja Obrenović
Guitar (Hm noise) — Predrag Guculj
Guitar, vocals — Aleksandar Vasiljević, Rambo Amadeus
Keyboards, sampler — Digital Mandrak
Vocals (sample) — Rade Šerbedžija

Legacy
In 2015 Hoćemo gusle album cover was ranked 76th on the list of 100 Greatest Album Covers of Yugoslav Rock published by web magazine Balkanrock.

References

External links
Hoćemo gusle on Discogs
Music section on Rambo Amadeus' official web site

Rambo Amadeus albums
1989 albums
PGP-RTB albums